The 1997–98 2. Bundesliga season was the twenty-fourth season of the 2. Bundesliga, the second tier of the German football league system.

Eintracht Frankfurt, SC Freiburg and 1. FC Nürnberg were promoted to the Bundesliga while VfB Leipzig, FC Carl Zeiss Jena, FSV Zwickau and SV Meppen were relegated to the Regionalliga.

League table
For the 1997–98 season SpVgg Greuther Fürth, Energie Cottbus, SG Wattenscheid 09 and 1. FC Nürnberg were newly promoted to the 2. Bundesliga from the Regionalliga while Fortuna Düsseldorf, SC Freiburg and FC St. Pauli had been relegated to the league from the Bundesliga.

Results

Top scorers
The league's top scorers:

References

External links
 2. Bundesliga 1997/1998 at Weltfussball.de 
 1997–98 2. Bundesliga  kicker.de

1997-98
2
Germany